Walter Stull (January 27, 1879 – June 10, 1961) was an American film actor and director. He appeared in more than 90 films between 1911 and 1917 as well as directing 13 films between 1915 and 1916. He was born in Nebraska, and died in Los Angeles, California.

He played Jabbs (sometimes spelled Jabs) in the Pokes and Jabbs silent comedies of the mid 1910s, with Bobby Burns as Pokes and frequently featuring Babe (Oliver) Hardy. He later appeared briefly as Finn with Billy Ruge as Haddie in the Finn and Haddie comedies.

Selected filmography
 The Midnight Prowlers (1915)
 Pressing Business (1915)
 Love, Pepper and Sweets
 Strangled Harmony (1915)
 Speed Kings (1915)
 Mixed and Fixed (1915)
 Ups and Downs (1915)
 This Way Out (1916)
 Chickens (1916)
 Frenzied Finance (1916)
 Busted Hearts (1916)
 Hired and Fired (1916)
 The Try Out (1916)

External links

1879 births
1961 deaths
American male film actors
Male actors from Los Angeles
20th-century American male actors
American film directors